Scopula butyrosa is a moth of the family Geometridae. It was described by Warren in 1893. It is found in India (Sikkim).

References

Moths described in 1893
Moths of Asia
butyrosa
Taxa named by William Warren (entomologist)